Baruch Schleisinger Weil, born Baruch Schleisinger, also known as Benjamin S. Weil, was a French American immigrant, farmer, real estate broker, and politician.  He is the founder and namesake of Slinger, Wisconsin; he served three years in the Wisconsin State Senate and four years in the Assembly representing Washington County.

Biography

Born in Strasbourg, Alsace, France, in a Jewish family, as Baruch Schleisinger, he legally changed his name to Baruch Schleisinger Weil. In 1843, he emigranted to the United States, settling first in New York City and then in New Orleans. Then in 1845 he moved to Wisconsin Territory. Weil platted the village of Schleisingerville, Wisconsin (now Slinger, Wisconsin) in Washington County, Wisconsin, where he had various business interests. Since the nearest Jewish community was in Milwaukee, he arranged for teachers to come the roughly 35 miles by ox team to instruct his children.

In 1853, 1856, 1857, Weil served as a Democratic member of the Wisconsin State Senate from Washington County's 4th Senate District. He also served in the Wisconsin State Assembly in 1852, 1871–1873, and 1880.

Weil served in the Wisconsin Militia as a brigadier general. Eventually Weil and his family moved to West Bend, Wisconsin and then to Milwaukee, Wisconsin. Weil died in Chicago, Illinois, on March 28, 1893, and is buried at Greenwood Cemetery in Milwaukee.

References

External links

1802 births
1893 deaths
American city founders
Military personnel from Wisconsin
Farmers from Wisconsin
Businesspeople from Wisconsin
Democratic Party members of the Wisconsin State Assembly
Businesspeople from Strasbourg
People from West Bend, Wisconsin
Democratic Party Wisconsin state senators
American real estate brokers
19th-century American politicians
People from Slinger, Wisconsin
French emigrants to the United States
Politicians from Strasbourg